Count Manó Széchényi de Sárvár-Felsővidék (30 July 1858 – 29 December 1926) was a Hungarian politician, who served as Minister besides the King between 1898 and 1900. During his career he was an ambassador to the German Empire, Kingdom of Greece and the Italian Kingdom. He was a member of the Sovereign Military Order of Malta. He had a big role in the peace conferencies about the Greco-Turkish War, for which one he got an Order of Leopold. He also worked in Russia, Saint Petersburg.

Széchényi's wife was Countess Maria Theresia Revertera von Salandra from 1907. They had no children. However Mano fathered a child, Vera, with Isabella Waldberg with whom he had a long-term relationship.

References
 Magyar Életrajzi Lexikon

1858 births
1926 deaths
People from Sopron
Hungarian diplomats
Foreign ministers of Hungary
Mano, Szechenyi